Sergej Grubač (Montenegrin Cyrillic: Сергеј Грубач; born 29 May 2000) is a Montenegrin professional footballer who plays as a striker for Romanian club Chindia Târgoviște.

Club career

APOEL
He made his Cypriot First Division debut for APOEL at the age of 17 in a game against Olympiakos Nicosia on 25 November 2017.

Chievo Verona
On 3 July 2018 Grubač signed a five-year contract for Italian Seria A side Chievo. He made his league debut on 14 April 2018 against Napoli. Chievo was excluded from Serie B in the summer of 2021 due to debts, making him a free agent.

Chindia Târgoviște
On 7 September 2022, Grubač joined Romanian club Chindia Târgoviște.

International career
Born in Serbia, Grubač was a member of all the  Montenegro national youth teams. He scored 11 goals in 25 appearances for Montenegro under-17 and Montenegro under-19

Personal life
He is a son of former Hamburger SV striker Vanja Grubač.

Honours

APOEL
Cypriot First Division: 2017–18
Cypriot Super Cup runner-up: 2017

References

External links
 

2000 births
Living people
Footballers from Belgrade
Serbian people of Montenegrin descent
Naturalized citizens of Cyprus
Montenegrin emigrants to Cyprus
Association football forwards
Montenegrin footballers
Montenegro youth international footballers
Montenegro under-21 international footballers
APOEL FC players
A.C. ChievoVerona players
Cypriot First Division players
Serie A players
Serie B players
FC Botoșani players
AFC Chindia Târgoviște players
Liga I players
Montenegrin expatriate footballers
Expatriate footballers in Cyprus
Montenegrin expatriate sportspeople in Cyprus
Expatriate footballers in Italy
Montenegrin expatriate sportspeople in Italy
Expatriate footballers in Romania
Montenegrin expatriate sportspeople in Romania